The 1944 Ohio State Buckeyes football team represented Ohio State University in the 1944 Big Ten Conference football season. The Buckeyes compiled a 9–0 record. The Buckeyes also outscored opponents 287–79 during the season. The team was named a national champion by the National Championship Foundation and the Sagarin Ratings, but this championship is not claimed by Ohio State.

Schedule

Coaching staff
 Carroll Widdoes, head coach, first year

Awards and honors
 Les Horvath, Heisman Trophy

1945 NFL draftees

References

Ohio State
Ohio State Buckeyes football seasons
College football national champions
Big Ten Conference football champion seasons
College football undefeated seasons
Ohio State Buckeyes football